Arebo Taumaku was a Papua New Guinean rugby league player who represented Papua New Guinea, including in the Rugby League World Cup matches.

References

Papua New Guinean rugby league players
Papua New Guinea national rugby league team captains
Papua New Guinea national rugby league team players
Rugby league second-rows
Rugby league locks
Living people
Year of birth missing (living people)